was the daughter of Kitabatake Morochika, and Imperial consort to Emperor Go-Daigo. She had earlier been Imperial consort to Go-Daigo's father, Emperor Go-Uda.

She was the mother of Prince Morinaga.

References
 A Guide to Kamakura, Kamakura-gū, retrieved on June 21, 2008

Year of birth missing
Year of death missing
Royal consorts